Lady Li may refer to any woman in imperial China with the surname Li, such as:

Empress Li (disambiguation)
Empress Dowager Li (disambiguation)
Consort Li (disambiguation)
Lady Li (died between 104 and 101 BC), concubine of Emperor Wu of Han
Lady Li (Three Kingdoms) (李氏, died 263), noble lady and aristocrat from the Three Kingdoms period. 
Li Zhaoyi, concubine of Liu Shan of the Shu Han state during the Three Kingdoms period.
Lady Li (Wang Jipeng) ( 10th century), consort of the Min emperor Wang Jipeng
Li Qingzhao (1084–1156), Song dynasty poet